"Sono Mirai wa Ima" is a song and single by The Pillows. It was featured in the album Good Dreams. Sawao Yamanaka, The Pillows lead songwriter, wrote "Beehive" for the J-Pop artist Chihiro Yonekura, which is featured on her album "azure".

Track listing

"Beehive"
"Heavy Sun (With Baby Son)"

2004 singles
The Pillows songs
2004 songs
King Records (Japan) singles